Phua Chu Kang Sdn Bhd was a Malaysian sitcom and sequel to the Singaporean sitcom Phua Chu Kang Pte Ltd that debuted on Mediacorp Channel 5. The series reprises Gurmit Singh and Irene Ang as Phua Chu Kang and Rosie respectively, and is produced in collaboration with Mediacorp. It made its debut on NTV7 on 25 March 2009 and 6 October 2009 on Mediacorp Channel 5. This was the first time Singh and Ang appeared in a show entirely filmed and produced in Malaysia, with the rest of the cast featuring Malaysian actors. The second season premiered on 7 October 2010 on NTV7.

Synopsis

Season 1
Phua Chu Kang Sdn Bhd continues from the events of Phua Chu Kang Pte Ltd. Phua Chu Kang and his wife Rosie Phua leave Singapore to expand their business in Malaysia. He forges a partnership with millionaire Izzy to turn their construction company into a more successful business. Izzy's mother Fatimah becomes a maid at the Phuas' house and Rosie's sexy sister Suzie moves in with them. In need of workers to boss around, Chu Kang hires Bang, who is all brawn and no brain. Soon, Chu Kang's company is threatened as he learns that Izzy's brother Fazzy has his own construction business and is his main rival.

Season 2
The finale continues with Chu Kang who is now suffering amnesia.

See also
 Phua Chu Kang Pte Ltd
 Phua Chu Kang The Movie

References

External links 
 ntv7 Website
 MediacorpTV Channel 5 Website

2009 Malaysian television series debuts
2009 Singaporean television series debuts
Malaysian comedy television series
Singaporean comedy television series
2000s Malaysian television series
NTV7 original programming
Channel 5 (Singapore) original programming